Tai-Ping Liu (born 18 November 1945) is a Taiwanese mathematician, specializing in partial differential equations.

Liu received his bachelor's degree in mathematics in 1968 from National Taiwan University, his master's degree in 1970 from Oregon State University, and his PhD in 1973 from University of Michigan with thesis advisor Joel Smoller and thesis Riemann problem for general 2 × 2 systems of conservation laws. Afterwards Liu was a professor at University of Maryland, from 1988 at New York University and from 1990 at Stanford University, where he is now retired. Since 2000 he has been a Distinguished Research Fellow at the Academia Sinica. He was elected a Fellow of the American Mathematical Society in 2012.

His research deals with nonlinear partial differential equations, hyperbolic conservation laws, shock waves, the Boltzmann equation, and equations of gas dynamics. He is the author or coauthor of over 140 research publications.

In 1998 he gave the DiPerna lecture. In 1992 Liu became a member of Academia Sinica. In 2002 he was an Invited Speaker with talk Shock Waves at the International Congress of Mathematicians in Beijing.

Selected publications
 Hyperbolic and viscous conservation laws, CBMS Regional Conference, SIAM 2000 
 Admissible solutions of hyperbolic conservation laws, Memoirs AMS, No. 240, 1981.
 Nonlinear stability of shock waves for viscous conservation laws, Memoirs AMS, No. 328, 1985
 with Y. Zeng: Large-time Behavior of Solutions of General Quasilinear Hyperbolic-Parabolic Systems of Conservation Laws, Memoirs AMS, No. 599, 1997
 as editor with Heinrich Freistühler and Anders Szepessy: Advances in the theory of shock waves, Birkhäuser 2001

References

External links
 website at Academia Sinica
 
 Workshop on Kinetic Theory and Fluid Dynamics, Seoul National University, October 2009
 
 
 

20th-century Taiwanese mathematicians
21st-century Taiwanese mathematicians
National Taiwan University alumni
Oregon State University alumni
University of Michigan alumni
University of Maryland, College Park faculty
New York University faculty
Stanford University faculty
Members of Academia Sinica
Fellows of the American Mathematical Society
1945 births
Living people